KlingStubbins was an architectural, engineering, interior, and planning firm headquartered in Philadelphia, with offices in Cambridge, Massachusetts; Raleigh, North Carolina; San Francisco; Washington, D.C.; and Beijing.  In 1982, the Franklin Institute awarded Vincent G. Kling the Frank P. Brown Medal.

Firm history
KlingStubbins was formed through the merger of two offices in 2007. The first, The Kling-Lindquist Partnership, Inc., was founded by Vincent Kling (1916–2013) in 1946, and grew to become the largest firm in Philadelphia. One of the most recognizable buildings designed by Kling is the Bell Atlantic Tower, which was completed in 1991 and remains among the tallest buildings in Philadelphia. Kling also collaborated with Philadelphia city planner Edmund Bacon.

The Stubbins Associates was founded by Hugh Stubbins, FAIA, in 1949 and based in Cambridge, Massachusetts. Hugh Stubbins had designed several of the world's most noted skyscrapers, including the Citicorp Center in New York City, the Federal Reserve Bank of Boston headquarters in Boston, and the Yokohama Landmark Tower, the tallest building in Japan. Kling became affiliated with The Stubbins Associates in 2003, and the two officially merged on January 1, 2007. The company grew to include engineering, interior design, landscape architecture, and several branch offices in other cities.

Michael Paul Smith, later founder of the popular Elgin Park miniature imaginary village, worked for the company as model maker in the 1970s.

In 2011, KlingStubbins was acquired by Jacobs Engineering Group and operates as part of their Global Buildings sector.

Notable designs

 Campbell's Employee Center, Camden, New Jersey, 2010 
 Autodesk AEC Headquarters, Waltham, Massachusetts, 2008 
 AT&T Headquarters Basking Ridge, New Jersey (1971-1974)
 United States Postal Service Processing & Distribution Center, Philadelphia, 2006
 Merck Research Laboratories Boston, 2005
 University of Colorado Health Sciences Center Research Complex I, Aurora, Colorado,  2005
 The Venetian Resort, Las Vegas, USA, 2003
 Wyeth Headquarters Phase II, Collegeville, Pennsylvania
 Bell Atlantic Tower, Philadelphia, 1991
 Penn Center, Philadelphia, 1950s
 GlaxoSmithKline Pharmaceutical R&D Headquarters Complex, Research Triangle Park, North Carolina
 Dow Jones & Company Corporate Office Facility, Princeton, New Jersey
 SAP AG America Corporate Headquarters, Newtown Square, Pennsylvania
 International Monetary Fund Headquarters (Phases I, 2 and 3), Washington, DC 1971–1999
 Congress Hall, Berlin
 Yokohama Landmark Tower, Yokohama, Japan
 Lankenau Medical Center, Wynnewood, Pennsylvania
 Veterans Stadium, Philadelphia
 Citigroup Center, New York City
 Ronald Reagan Presidential Library, Simi Valley, California
 One Cleveland Center, Cleveland
 Federal Reserve Bank of Boston
 PacWest Center, Portland, Oregon
 Salesforce Tower, Indianapolis
 Nashville City Center, Nashville, Tennessee

Publications
Both The Stubbins Associates and Kling-Lindquist have published several architectural monographs.  Their first combined volume, KlingStubbins: Palimpsest, was published in 2009 by Images Publishing.  Drawing on several years of in-house research on laboratory design, KlingStubbins published a design reference book, Sustainable Design of Research Laboratories: Planning, Design, and Operation, through Wiley in 2010, which examines inter-disciplinary design strategies for sustainable design and energy efficiency in the design and operation of research laboratories.

Project delivery innovation
With their Autodesk Headquarters in Waltham, MA, KlingStubbins became the first architectural firm in New England to employ an Integrated Project Delivery (IPD) model.  As opposed to traditional project delivery methods in which a project owner employs an architect/engineering team for design services and a contractor team for building services on separate contracts, IPD requires the owner, architect, and builder to sign a shared contract, expediting the design/building process and sharing both liability and profits among the three parties.  The project garnered international recognition for the design but also for the novelty of its project structure, which resulted in a significantly faster project schedule, no legal disputes among the various parties, and no change orders on the construction site.

Honors and awards
 Autodesk AEC Headquarters, Waltham, MA, USA, 2008
  Kling elected into the National Academy of Design, 1964

References

External links
 
 DesignIntelligence article on Kling-Stubbins affiliation

Design companies established in 1946
Architecture firms based in Pennsylvania
Companies based in Philadelphia
1946 establishments in Pennsylvania
Design companies disestablished in 2011
2011 disestablishments in Pennsylvania